Henry Irwin Haughton (2 January 1886 – 19 January 1958) was an Australian rules footballer who played for Carlton in the Victorian Football League (VFL) during the 1910s.

A versatile player from Northcote, Haughton was already 26 when recruited by Carlton but still managed to play for eight seasons. He was a dual premiership player at Carlton, appearing in their winning 1914 and 1915 Grand Final teams. In the first Grand Final he was used on a half back flank but played in the ruck the following year. Haughton, a New Zealander by birth, was also a member of the side which lost the 1916 Grand Final. While at Carlton he represented the VFL at interstate football in 1913 and at the 1914 Sydney Carnival.

He finished his career back in the Victorian Football Association where he was appointed captain-coach of Williamstown in 1920. He stepped down from the coaching role in 1921 but stayed on as a player and starred at centre half-forward in Williamstown's premiership victory over Footscray at Fitzroy's Brunswick St Oval, where the Villagers prevailed by 3 goals, 8.9 to 5.9. He played on at age 36 until half-way through 1922 before taking up a country coaching position. He played a total of 45 games and kicked 72 goals during his time at Williamstown.

References
Holmesby, Russell and Main, Jim (2007). The Encyclopedia of AFL Footballers. 7th ed. Melbourne: Bas Publishing.

External links

Blueseum profile

1886 births
1958 deaths
Australian rules footballers from Victoria (Australia)
Australian Rules footballers: place kick exponents
Carlton Football Club players
Carlton Football Club Premiership players
Northcote Football Club players
Williamstown Football Club players
Williamstown Football Club coaches
VFL/AFL players born outside Australia
New Zealand players of Australian rules football
New Zealand emigrants to Australia
Two-time VFL/AFL Premiership players